Nelly Corradi (1914–1968) was an Italian opera singer and actress. She made her screen debut in Max Ophüls' 1934 film Everybody's Woman.

Selected filmography
 Dimmed Lights (1934)
 Everybody's Woman (1934)
 Il Torrente (1937)
 No Man's Land (1939)
 La zia smemorata (1940)
 Headlights in the Fog (1942)
 Measure for Measure (1943)
 The Barber of Seville (1947)
 The Lady of the Camellias (1947)
 The Legend of Faust (1949)
 The Force of Destiny (1950)
 The Count of Saint Elmo (1950)
 Puccini (1953)
 House of Ricordi (1954)

References

External links

Bibliography
 Bayman, Louis. Directory of World Cinema: Italy. Intellect Books, 2011.

1914 births
1968 deaths
Italian film actresses
Actors from Parma
20th-century Italian actresses
20th-century Italian women opera singers
Musicians from Parma